The scant-striped ctenotus (Ctenotus vertebralis)  is a species of skink found in the Northern Territory in Australia.

References

vertebralis
Reptiles described in 1979
Taxa named by Peter R. Rankin
Taxa named by Mike W. Gillam